William Duane Benton (born September 8, 1950), known professionally as Duane Benton, is a United States circuit judge of the United States Court of Appeals for the Eighth Circuit.

Education 
Benton graduated from Northwestern University with a Bachelor of Arts degree in 1972, and received a Juris Doctor from Yale Law School in 1975, where he was Managing Editor of the Yale Law Journal and graduated alongside Justice Samuel Alito. Benton also has a Master of Business Administration from Memphis State University and a Master of Laws from the University of Virginia School of Law. Subsequently, Benton was selected as a Danforth Fellow at Harvard's John F. Kennedy School of Government, where he completed the Senior Executive's Program.

Career 
Prior to joining the federal bench, Benton served on the Supreme Court of Missouri from 1991 to 2004, where he was Chief Justice from 1997 to 1999. Benton was director of the Missouri Department of Revenue in the administration of then-Governor John Ashcroft from 1989 to 1991, and served as an administrative aide to a United States Congressman Wendell Bailey from 1981 to 1982. From 1983 to 1989, Benton practiced law in Jefferson City, Missouri. Benton served as a captain in the U.S. Navy/Naval Reserve from 1972 to 2002, and as judge advocate in the U.S. Navy from 1975 to 1979. Benton has taught at the University of Missouri School of Law, and at Westminster College in Fulton, Missouri.

Federal judicial service 
Benton was nominated by President George W. Bush on February 12, 2004, to a seat vacated by Theodore McMillian and confirmed just over four months later by the United States Senate by a voice vote on June 24, 2004. He received his commission on July 2, 2004. 

In 2018, Judge Benton found that Missouri's requirement of a state license to braid hair did not violate the Constitution.

Personal life
Benton currently resides in Kansas City, Missouri, with his wife Sandra and has two children.

References

External links

1950 births
21st-century American judges
Chief Justices of the Supreme Court of Missouri
Judges of the United States Court of Appeals for the Eighth Circuit
Living people
Northwestern University alumni
Politicians from Columbia, Missouri
State cabinet secretaries of Missouri
United States court of appeals judges appointed by George W. Bush
University of Missouri faculty
University of Virginia School of Law alumni
Westminster College (Missouri) faculty
Yale Law School alumni
Judges of the Supreme Court of Missouri